Zimapán (Otomi: Mabo̱za) is a town and one of the 84 municipalities of Hidalgo, in central-eastern Mexico.

The name Zimapán derives from the Nahuatl words "cimatl", meaning "cimate" (a root used to ferment pulque) and "pan", meaning "inside or over"; which makes the meaning of Zimapán "over the cimate" or "in the cimate".

As of 2020, the municipality had a total population of 39,927. Zimapán has a regional hospital and seven health centers. It also has 32 Casas de Salud, or health houses.

Los Mármoles National Park is located in the municipality, northeast of the town in the Sierra Madre Oriental.

History 
The land was place for Otomi and Quinamí indigenous people, which later received influence from Olmecs and Nahuas. In 1522, after the Conquista, Spanish colonalists founded the city of Zimapán. Augustinian friars built the first church of Zimapán in the XVIII Century and later they built another, which building ended in 1822.

Vanadium was discovered by first time here in 1801 by Andrés Manuel del Río. During the Mexican Revolution, General Otilio Villegas won a battle for the "Carrancistas" in Zimapán.

The city was declared a "Pueblo Mágico" in 2018.

References

Municipalities of Hidalgo (state)
Populated places in Hidalgo (state)
Otomi settlements
Pueblos Mágicos